"That's What They Always Say" is a song by British singer-songwriter Chris Rea, released in 1989 as the second single from his tenth studio album The Road to Hell. It was written by Rea and produced by Rea and Jon Kelly. As the follow-up to "The Road to Hell", "That's What They Always Say" reached No. 83 in the UK Singles Chart and remained in the Top 100 for four weeks.

Critical reception
Upon its release, Music & Media wrote: "A strong follow-up to "The Road to Hell". A rockier number with a good dance pulse." In a review of The Road to Hell, David Law of The Charlatan commented: "The angry but soulful "That's What They Always Say" intensifies the [album's theme of] despair, personalizing the plight of a gullible dreamer who believed the promises of politicians."

Track listing
7" single
 "That's What They Always Say" (Remix) – 4:03
 "1975" – 4:30

12" single
 "That's What They Always Say" (Rainbow Mix) – 6:40
 "That's What They Always Say" (Remix) – 4:08
 "1975" – 4:33

CD single (German release)
 "That's What They Always Say" (Remix) – 4:12
 "That's What They Always Say" (Extended Remix) – 5:45
 "1975" – 4:39
 "Driving Home for Christmas" – 3:59

Personnel
 Chris Rea - vocals, guitars, keyboards
 Robert Ahwai - bass
 Martin Ditcham - drums, percussion
 Linda Taylor, Karen Boddington, Carol Kenyon - backing vocals

Production
 Chris Rea, Jon Kelly - producers
 Neil Amor - engineer
 Diane BJ Koné - assistant engineer
 Bill Frutz, Jack Frutz - remixers on "Rainbox Mix"

Other
 The Leisure Process - sleeve design

Charts

References

1989 songs
1989 singles
Chris Rea songs
Warner Music Group singles
Songs written by Chris Rea